Spartacus (c. 103–71 BC) was a Thracian gladiator who, along with Crixus, Gannicus, Castus, and Oenomaus, was one of the escaped slave leaders in the Third Servile War, a major slave uprising against the Roman Republic. Little is known about him beyond the events of the war, and surviving historical accounts are sometimes contradictory. All sources agree that he was a former gladiator and an accomplished military leader.

This rebellion, interpreted by some as an example of oppressed people fighting for their freedom against a slave-owning oligarchy, has provided inspiration for many political thinkers, and has been featured in literature, television, and film. The philosopher Voltaire described the Third Servile War as "the only just war in history". Although this interpretation is not specifically contradicted by classical historians, no historical account mentions that the goal was to end slavery in the Republic.

Early life
The Greek essayist Plutarch describes Spartacus as "a Thracian of Nomadic stock", in a possible reference to the Maedi tribe. Appian says he was "a Thracian by birth, who had once served as a soldier with the Romans, but had since been a prisoner and sold for a gladiator".

Florus described him as one "who, from a Thracian mercenary, had become a Roman soldier, that had deserted and became enslaved, and afterward, from consideration of his strength, a gladiator". The authors refer to the Thracian tribe of the Maedi, which occupied the area on the southwestern fringes of Thrace, along its border with the Roman province of Macedonia – present day south-western Bulgaria. Plutarch also writes that Spartacus's wife, a prophetess of the Maedi tribe, was enslaved with him.

The name Spartacus is otherwise manifested in the Black Sea region. Five out of twenty Kings of the Thracian Spartocid dynasty of the Cimmerian Bosporus and Pontus are known to have borne it, and a Thracian "Sparta" "Spardacus" or "Sparadokos", father of Seuthes I of the Odrysae, is also known.

One modern author estimates that Spartacus was around 30 years old at the time he started his revolt, which would put his birth year around 103 BC.

Enslavement and escape

According to the differing sources and their interpretation, Spartacus was a captive taken by the legions. Spartacus was trained at the gladiatorial school (ludus) near Capua belonging to Lentulus Batiatus. He was a heavyweight gladiator called a murmillo. These fighters carried a large oblong shield (scutum), and used a sword with a broad, straight blade (gladius), about 18 inches long. In 73 BC, Spartacus was among a group of gladiators plotting an escape.

About 70 slaves were part of the plot. Though few in number, they seized kitchen utensils, fought their way free from the school, and seized several wagons of gladiatorial weapons and armour. The escaped slaves defeated soldiers sent after them, plundered the region surrounding Capua, recruited many other slaves into their ranks, and eventually retired to a more defensible position on Mount Vesuvius.

Once free, the escaped gladiators chose Spartacus and two Gallic slaves—Crixus and Oenomaus—as their leaders. Although Roman authors assumed that the escaped slaves were a homogeneous group with Spartacus as their leader, they may have projected their own hierarchical view of military leadership onto the spontaneous organization, reducing other slave leaders to subordinate positions in their accounts.

Third Servile War

The response of the Romans was hampered by the absence of the Roman legions, which were engaged in fighting a revolt in Hispania and the Third Mithridatic War. Furthermore, the Romans considered the rebellion more of a policing matter than a war. Rome dispatched militia under the command of the praetor Gaius Claudius Glaber, who besieged Spartacus and his camp on Mount Vesuvius, hoping that starvation would force Spartacus to surrender. They were taken by surprise when Spartacus used ropes made from vines to climb down the steep side of the volcano with his men and attacked the unfortified Roman camp in the rear, killing most of the militia.

The rebels also defeated a second expedition against them, nearly capturing the praetor commander, killing his lieutenants, and seizing the military equipment. Due to these successes, more and more slaves flocked to the Spartacan forces, as did many of the herdsmen and shepherds of the region, swelling their ranks to some 70,000. At its height, Spartacus's army included many different peoples, including Celts, Gauls, and others. Due to the previous Social War (91–87 BC), some of Spartacus's ranks were legion veterans. Of the slaves that joined Spartacus ranks, many were from the countryside. Rural slaves lived a life that better prepared them to fight in Spartacus's army. In contrast, urban slaves were more used to city life and were considered "privileged" and "lazy."

In these altercations, Spartacus proved to be an excellent tactician, suggesting that he may have had previous military experience. Though the rebels lacked military training, they displayed skilful use of available local materials and unusual tactics against the disciplined Roman armies. They spent the winter of 73–72 BC training, arming and equipping their new recruits, and expanding their raiding territory to include the towns of Nola, Nuceria, Thurii and Metapontum. The distance between these locations and the subsequent events indicate that the slaves operated in two groups commanded by the remaining leaders Spartacus and Crixus.

In the spring of 72 BC, the rebels left their winter encampments and began to move northward. At the same time, the Roman Senate, alarmed by the defeat of the praetorian forces, dispatched a pair of consular legions under the command of Lucius Gellius and Gnaeus Cornelius Lentulus Clodianus. The two legions were initially successful—defeating a group of 30,000 rebels commanded by Crixus near Mount Garganus—but then were defeated by Spartacus. These defeats are depicted in divergent ways by the two most comprehensive (extant) histories of the war by Appian and Plutarch.

Alarmed at the continued threat posed by the slaves, the Senate charged Marcus Licinius Crassus, the wealthiest man in Rome and the only volunteer for the position, with ending the rebellion. Crassus was put in charge of eight legions, numbering upwards of 40,000 trained Roman soldiers; he treated these with harsh discipline, reviving the punishment of "decimation", in which one-tenth of his men were slain to make them more afraid of him than their enemy. When Spartacus and his followers, who for unclear reasons had retreated to the south of Italy, moved northward again in early 71 BC, Crassus deployed six of his legions on the borders of the region and detached his legate Mummius with two legions to maneuver behind Spartacus. Though ordered not to engage the rebels, Mummius attacked at a seemingly opportune moment but was routed. After this, Crassus's legions were victorious in several engagements, forcing Spartacus farther south through Lucania as Crassus gained the upper hand. By the end of 71 BC, Spartacus was encamped in Rhegium (Reggio Calabria), near the Strait of Messina.

According to Plutarch, Spartacus made a bargain with Cilician pirates to transport him and some 2,000 of his men to Sicily, where he intended to incite a slave revolt and gather reinforcements. However, he was betrayed by the pirates, who took payment and then abandoned the rebels. Minor sources mention that there were some attempts at raft and shipbuilding by the rebels as a means to escape, but that Crassus took unspecified measures to ensure the rebels could not cross to Sicily, and their efforts were abandoned. Spartacus's forces then retreated toward Rhegium. Crassus's legions followed and upon arrival built fortifications across the isthmus at Rhegium, despite harassing raids from the rebels. The rebels were now under siege and cut off from their supplies.

At this time, the legions of Pompey returned from Hispania and were ordered by the Senate to head south to aid Crassus. Crassus feared that Pompey's involvement would deprive him of credit for defeating Spartacus himself. Hearing of Pompey's involvement, Spartacus tried to make a truce with Crassus. When Crassus refused, Spartacus and his army broke through the Roman fortifications and headed to Brundusium with Crassus's legions in pursuit.

When the legions managed to catch a portion of the rebels separated from the main army, discipline among Spartacus's forces broke down as small groups independently attacked the oncoming legions. Spartacus now turned his forces around and brought his entire strength to bear on the legions in a last stand, in which the rebels were routed completely, with the vast majority of them being killed on the battlefield.

The final battle that saw the assumed defeat of Spartacus in 71 BC took place on the present territory of Senerchia on the right bank of the river Sele in the area that includes the border with Oliveto Citra up to those of Calabritto, near the village of Quaglietta, in the High Sele Valley, which at that time was part of Lucania. In this area, since 1899, there have been finds of armour and swords of the Roman era.

Plutarch, Appian and Florus all claim that Spartacus died during the battle, but Appian also reports that his body was never found. Six thousand survivors of the revolt captured by the legions of Crassus were crucified, lining the Appian Way from Rome to Capua.

Objectives
Classical historians were divided as to the motives of Spartacus. None of Spartacus's actions overtly suggest that he aimed at reforming Roman society or abolishing slavery.

Plutarch writes that Spartacus wished to escape north into Cisalpine Gaul and disperse his men back to their homes. If escaping the Italian peninsula was indeed his goal, it is not clear why Spartacus turned south after defeating the legions commanded by the consuls Lucius Publicola and Gnaeus Clodianus, which left his force a clear passage over the Alps.

Appian and Florus write that he intended to march on Rome itself. Appian also states that he later abandoned that goal, which might have been no more than a reflection of Roman fears.

Based on the events in late 73 BC and early 72 BC, which suggest independently operating groups of escaped slaves and a statement by Plutarch, it appears that some of the escaped slaves preferred to plunder Italy, rather than escape over the Alps.

Legacy and recognition
Toussaint Louverture, a leader of the slave revolt that led to the independence of Haiti, has been called the "Black Spartacus".

Adam Weishaupt, founder of the Bavarian Illuminati, often referred to himself as Spartacus within written correspondences.

In communism

In modern times, Spartacus became an icon for communists and socialists. Karl Marx listed Spartacus as one of his heroes and described him as "the most splendid fellow in the whole of ancient history" and a "great general, noble character, real representative of the ancient proletariat". Spartacus has been a great inspiration to left-wing revolutionaries, most notably the German Spartacus League (1915–18), a forerunner of the Communist Party of Germany. A January 1919 uprising by communists in Germany was called the Spartacist uprising. Spartacus Books, one of the longest running collectively-run leftist book stores in North America, is also named in his honour.  The village of Spartak, in Donetsk Oblast, Ukraine, is also named after Spartacus.

In sports
Several sports clubs around the world, in particular the former Soviet and the Communist bloc, were named after the Roman gladiator.

In Russia
 FC Spartak Moscow, a football club
 FC Spartak Kostroma, a football club
 PFC Spartak Nalchik, a football club
 FC Spartak Vladikavkaz, a football club
 HC Spartak Moscow, an ice hockey team
 Spartak Saint Petersburg, a basketball team
 Spartak Tennis Club, a tennis training facility
 WBC Spartak Moscow, a women's basketball team

In Ukraine
 FC Spartak Sumy, a football club
 Spartak Ivano-Frankivsk, a football team
 Zakarpattia Uzhhorod, a football club, formerly known as Spartak Uzhhorod
 Spartak Lviv
 Spartak Kyiv
 Spartak Odesa, a football team competed in the 1941 Soviet war league
 Spartak Kharkiv, a football team competed in the 1941 Soviet war league

In Bulgaria
 FC Spartak Varna, a football team
 OFC Spartak Pleven, a football team
 PFC Spartak Plovdiv, a football team
 Spartak Sofia, a defunct football team

In Serbia
 FK Spartak Subotica, a football team
 FK Radnički, several teams

In Slovakia
 FC Spartak Trnava, a football team
 TJ Spartak Myjava, a football team
 FK Spartak Vráble, a football team
 FK Spartak Bánovce nad Bebravou, a football team

In other countries
 Spartak Stadium (disambiguation)
 Barnt Green Spartak F.C., an English football team
 Spartak (Cape Verde), a Cape Verdean football team
 FC Spartak Semey, a Kazakh football team

Spartacus's name was also used in athletics in the Soviet Union and communist states of Central and Eastern Europe. The Spartakiad was a Soviet bloc version of the Olympic games. This name was also used for the mass gymnastics exhibition held every five years in Czechoslovakia. The mascot for the Ottawa Senators, Spartacat, is also named after him.

In popular culture

Film
 The film Spartacus (1960), which was executive-produced by and starred Kirk Douglas, was based on Howard Fast's novel Spartacus and directed by Stanley Kubrick. The phrase "I'm Spartacus!" from this film has been referenced in a number of other films, television programs, and commercials.

Television
 Fast's novel was adapted as a 2004 miniseries by the USA Network, with Goran Višnjić in the main role.
 One episode of 2007–2008 BBC's docudrama Heroes and Villains features Spartacus.
 The television series Spartacus, starring Andy Whitfield and later Liam McIntyre in the title role, aired on the Starz premium cable network from January 2010 to April 2013.
 The History Channel's Barbarians Rising (2016) features the story of Spartacus in its second episode entitled "Rebellion".
 The fifth series of sitcom Outnumbered had Ben Brockmans (Daniel Roche) play Spartacus in a musical called Spartacus.
 Spartacus appears in the season 6 premiere of DC's Legends of Tomorrow, portrayed by Shawn Roberts. He is abducted and eaten by an alien.

Literature
 Howard Fast wrote the historical novel Spartacus, the basis of the 1960 film of the same name.
 Arthur Koestler wrote a novel about Spartacus called The Gladiators.
 The Scottish writer Lewis Grassic Gibbon wrote a novel Spartacus.
 The Italian writer Raffaello Giovagnoli wrote his historical novel, Spartacus, in 1874. His novel has been subsequently translated and published in many European countries.
 The German writer Bertolt Brecht wrote Spartacus, his second play, before 1920. It was later renamed Drums in the Night.
 The Latvian writer Andrejs Upīts in 1943 wrote the play Spartacus.
 The Polish writer  in 1951 wrote a novel Uczniowie Spartakusa (Spartacus's disciples).
 The Reverend Elijah Kellogg's Spartacus to the Gladiators at Capua has been used effectively by school pupils to practice their oratory skills for ages.
 Amal Donkol, the Egyptian modern poet wrote "The Last Words of Spartacus".
 Max Gallo wrote the novel Les Romains.Spartacus. La Revolte des Esclaves, Librairie Artheme Fayard, 2006.
 In the Fate/Apocrypha light novel series by Yūichirō Higashide, Spartacus appears as a Berserker-class Servant summoned by the Red faction. In the anime adaptation of the novels, Spartacus is voiced by Satoshi Tsuruoka in Japanese and Josh Tomar in English. This version of Spartacus would also appear in the mobile RPG Fate/Grand Order.
Ben Kane wrote the novels Spartacus: The Gladiator and Spartacus: Rebellion, in 2012.

Music
 The "Spartacus Overture" was written by composer Camille Saint-Saëns in 1863. 
 "Love Theme From Spartacus" was a hit for composer Alex North and has become a jazz standard.
 Spartacus (1954, first staged in 1956) is a ballet, with a score by Soviet Armenian composer Aram Khachaturian.
 In 1975, Triumvirat reached the apex of their commercial success with the release of Spartacus, a classic "prog rock" album.
 Australian composer Carl Vine wrote a short piano piece entitled "Spartacus", from Red Blues.
 Phantom Regiment's show, "Spartacus", was the championship show of the 2008 Drum Corps International season.
 Jeff Wayne released his musical retelling, Jeff Wayne's Musical Version of Spartacus, in 1992.

Video games
 In Age of Empires: The Rise of Rome Expansion IV Enemies of Rome, 3: Spartacus the campaign has the player fighting against Spartacus's army.
 In Spartacus Legends, Spartacus appears as an endgame boss.
 In Gladihoppers, He appears as a playable character in the Spartacus War, if the player chose the Spartacus Rebellion mode. If the player names the character in Career Mode, Spartacus, the player will receive Spartacus's sword.

Board games 

 In the expandable miniature wargaming system Heroscape, Spartacus appears as a unique gladiator hero, having been rescued by the Archkyrie Einar before his death.

Places
 Spartacus Peak on Livingston Island in the South Shetland Islands.

See also

 Alaric I
 Ambiorix
 Ardaric
 Arminius
 Autaritus
 Bato
 Battle of Baduhenna Wood
 Boudica
 Fritigern
 Gaius Julius Civilis
 John of Gothia
 List of people who disappeared
 Totila
 Vercingetorix
 Viriathus

References

Bibliography

Classical authors
 Appian. Civil Wars. Translated by J. Carter. (Harmondsworth: Penguin Books, 1996)
 Florus. Epitome of Roman History. (London: W. Heinemann, 1947)
 Orosius. The Seven Books of History Against the Pagans. Translated by Roy J. Deferrari. (Washington, DC: Catholic University of America Press, 1964).
 Plutarch. Fall of the Roman Republic. Translated by R. Warner. (London: Penguin Books, 1972), with special emphasis placed on "The Life of Crassus" and "The Life of Pompey".
 Sallust. Conspiracy of Catiline and the War of Jugurtha. (London: Constable, 1924)

Modern historiography
 Bradley, Keith R. Slavery and Rebellion in the Roman World, 140 B.C.–70 B.C. Bloomington; Indianapolis: Indiana University Press, 1989 (hardcover); 1998 (paperback). [Chapter V] The Slave War of Spartacus, pp. 83–101.
 Rubinsohn, Wolfgang Zeev. Spartacus' Uprising and Soviet Historical Writing. Oxford: Oxbow Books, 1987 (paperback).
 Spartacus: Film and History, edited by Martin M. Winkler. Oxford: Blackwell Publishers, 2007 (hardcover, ; paperback).
 Trow, M.J. Spartacus: The Myth and the Man. Stroud, United Kingdom: Sutton Publishing, 2006 (hardcover).
 Genner, Michael. "Spartakus. Eine Gegengeschichte des Altertums nach den Legenden der Zigeuner". Two volumes. Paperback. Trikont Verlag, München 1979/1980. Vol 1  Vol 2 
 Plamen Pavlov, Stanimir Dimitrov,Spartak – sinyt na drenva Trakija/Spartacus – the Son of ancient Thrace. Sofia, 2009, 
 
Beard, Mary. SPQR A History of Ancient Rome. New York: Liveright Publishing Corporation, 2015,

External links

 BBC Radio 4 – In Our Time – Spartacus
 Spartacus  Article and full text of the Roman and Greek sources.
 Spartacus, movie starring Kirk Douglas and Sir Peter Ustinov
 Spartacus, television mini-series starring Goran Višnjić and Alan Bates
 Starz Mini-Series airing in 2010

 
100s BC births
71 BC deaths
Year of birth uncertain
1st-century BC Romans
Ancient Thracians killed in battle
Deaths by blade weapons
Rebel slaves in ancient Rome
Roman-era Thracians
Roman gladiators

Third Servile War
Thracian people
Republican era slaves and freedmen